The Commons, previously Common Alternative Revolutionary Force (FARC) until 24 January 2021, is a communist political party in Colombia, established in 2017 as the political successor of the former rebel group the Revolutionary Armed Forces of Colombia (FARC). The peace accords agreed upon by the Revolutionary Armed Forces of Colombia and the Colombian government in 2016 provided for the FARC's participation in politics as a legal, registered political party following its successful disarmament.

The party was founded after a failed referendum in October 2016 with the majority of Colombian voters voting to reject the peace agreement. The "yes" campaign to accept the peace negotiations were pushed by President Santos, while the "no" campaign to reject the agreement was backed by former president Álvaro Uribe. The "no" vote won with 50.2% of the vote. The failed referendum came after four years of peace negotiations. After mild alterations to the peace agreements, the government approved the new deal by pushing it through Congress. This has led to some controversy with those who voted no arguing that the deal offered too much leniency.

Founding Congress 
The party's founding congress was held in the Bogota Convention Centre from August 28 to August 31, 2017 with the participation of one thousand delegates, including former FARC militants and members of the Colombian Clandestine Communist Party, as well as some 200 invitees from various sectors of Colombian society and delegations from left-wing groups in other countries, primarily those in Latin America and the Caribbean. The congress concluded on September 1 with the unveiling of the new party in Bogotá's Plaza Bolívar, with over ten thousand people in attendance. In his speech, party leader Timoleón Jiménez put forth a proposal for a national transition government for the 2018–2022 term.

The National Directorate is made up of 111 members. In total, 26 women were elected, representing 23% of the new party's leadership.

The party's original name, chosen to maintain the acronym FARC used by its armed predecessor, was agreed upon on 31 August 2017 during the party's founding congress, prevailing over the other proposed name, Nueva Colombia ("New Colombia") by 628 votes. The party's logo, a design with a rose and a red star in the center, was revealed at the same time.

Goals 
Comunes will have 10 automatic seats in Congress through 2026 per the deal reached via the accord. They will continue to attempt to fight poverty and corruption, specifically in rural areas, focusing on land reform. They are looking to form a coalition with other communist groups to gain additional seats in Congress 2018, as they remain ideologically Marxist.

Election results

House of Representatives

Senate

See also 
 Clandestine Colombian Communist Party
 
 Patriotic Union

References 

2017 establishments in Colombia
Colombian peace process
Communist parties in Colombia
Far-left politics in Colombia
 
Political parties established in 2017
International Meeting of Communist and Workers Parties